The Hindu Sena, is an Indian right-wing organization, founded on 10 August 2011 by Vishnu Gupta, who is also its current leader. It has been described as a "fringe right-wing organization".  

The Sena organized a birthday party for Donald Trump, then a candidate for US President, on 14 June 2016. The Sena had previously prayed for his victory in the 2016 US presidential election. In January 2016, four activists of the Hindu Sena vandalized the regional office of Pakistan International Airlines in New Delhi, demanding an end to diplomatic talks between India and Pakistan. One of the four men was arrested; the rest fled. Hindu Sena chief Vishnu Gupta was arrested on 25 December 2015, two days after he called the police and claimed that the restaurant of the hotel "Kerala House" was serving beef. Later, police stated that they were considering action against Gupta under Section 182 of the Indian Penal Code (false information, with intent to cause public servant to use his lawful power to the injury of another person). On 22nd September ,5 men from Hindu Sena were arrested for vandalizing residence of Asaduddin Owaisi.

References

External links 

 

India
Political organisations based in India
Far-right politics in India
Hinduism in Delhi
Hindu organizations
Hindu organisations based in India
Volunteer organisations in India
Hindu organizations established in the 21st century
2011 establishments in Delhi
Hindutva
Anti-Pakistan sentiment